Type II collagen is the basis for hyaline cartilage, including the articular cartilages at joint surfaces. It is formed by homotrimers of collagen, type II, alpha 1 chains.

It makes up 50% of all protein in cartilage and 85–90% of collagen of articular cartilage.

Type II collagen is organised into fibrils. This fibrillar network of collagen allows the cartilage to entrap the proteoglycan aggregate, as well as providing tensile strength to the tissue. Oral administration of native type II collagen induces oral tolerance to pathological immune responses and may be useful in arthritis.

See also 
 Type I collagen
 Collagen, type III, alpha 1

References

External links 
 

Collagens